Thirunavalur is a state assembly constituency in kallakurichi district in Tamil Nadu. Elections and winners in the constituency are listed below.

Members of Legislative Assembly

Election results

2006

2001

1996

1991

1989

1984

1980

1977

References

External links
 

Former assembly constituencies of Tamil Nadu
Viluppuram district